A stable bandage, or standing bandage/wrap, is a type of wrap used on the lower legs of a horse. A stable bandage runs from just below the knee or hock, to the bottom of the fetlock joint, and protects the cannon bone, tendons of the lower leg, and fetlock joint.

Uses of the stable bandage
Protection: the stable bandage offers some protection against minor cuts and bruises in a stall or horse trailer.
Securing a poultice/dressing: stable bandages are often used to hold a poultice on the lower legs, or to hold on a wound dressing on an injury.
To keep an injury clean: if a horse cuts his lower leg, a stable bandage can help keep the area from being contaminated by stall bedding or dirt. However, it may slow the healing process.
Reduce or prevent "filling": after hard work, or if a horse is kept in a stall for long periods of time, the lower legs of the animal may "fill" or "stock up", causing filled legs (fluid builds up and swells the leg). A stable bandage can help prevent this.
As a base: stable bandages are used as a "base" for bandages higher up on the leg (such as a knee or hock bandage). This prevents the swelling of the injury higher up from traveling down the leg.
When bandaging in pairs: when a horse injures a leg, it often places more weight, and thus excess stress, on the uninjured leg. To prevent the uninjured leg from swelling, it should also be bandaged. So both front legs, both hind legs, or all four legs should be bandaged.
Traveling: stable bandages are often used when shipping a horse, instead of using shipping bandages (which are more time-consuming to apply), or shipping boots (which may not offer as much protection). When used for shipping, it is best to also use bell boots on the front legs, as the heels and pasterns are not protected by a stable bandage.

Dangers of the stable bandage
An incorrectly applied stable bandage may do more harm than good. Therefore, it is important to learn from an experienced horseman, and to practice bandaging before keeping bandages on for long periods of time. Considerations to be aware of when bandaging include:

Tightness of the wrapping: If the wrapping is not tight enough, the bandage may slip down and possibly trip the horse. If it is too tight, or uneven, it may cut off circulation to the lower leg or cause "cording" or bandage bows.
Padding above and below the wrap: if too much padding is left above or below the bandage material, it may catch on something, and dislodge the bandage or frighten the caught horse.
Ending the bandage: The closures of bandage materials may catch on each other, or on the bandage of the opposite leg, if the bandage closures end on the inside of the leg. This could dislodge or open the bandage. Therefore, bandages should always end on the outside of the horse's leg.

Using a bandage with a poultice or leg dressing
Bandages should typically be changed every 12 hours. When a poultice is used, it is best to clean the leg with soap and water after removal, before re-applying a clean bandage.

Before a wound dressing is applied, the injury should be cleaned, and it should be recleaned between bandage cycles. The wrapping of the padding and bandage should be in the direction that best supports the closure of the wound. Gauze should be used between the padding and the leg injury.

See also
Polo wraps
Shipping bandage
Horse care

Horse management
Horse protective equipment